Anegcephalesis is a genus of snout moths described by Harrison Gray Dyar Jr. in 1917.

It contains the species A. arctella described by Émile Louis Ragonot in 1887. It is found in North America, with a wingspan about 23 mm.

The genus also contains Anegcephalesis cathaeretes.

References

Moths described in 1887
Phycitinae
Pyralidae genera
Taxa named by Harrison Gray Dyar Jr.